The 1962–63 season was the 83rd season of competitive football in England.

Overview
Everton won the League Championship, their first post-war title. Manchester United won the FA Cup, their first major trophy since the Munich Air Disaster in 1958.
Birmingham City won the League Cup. Tottenham Hotspur won the European Cup Winners' Cup, thereby becoming the first English side to win a European cup competition. Oxford United were elected to the Football League to replace the defunct Accrington Stanley, who had resigned from the league the previous season. Much of the season was postponed for several months because of the Big Freeze of 1963.

Diary of the season
3 October 1962: The England national football team competes in the European Football Championships for the first time, beginning the qualifiers for the 1964 European Nations' Cup with a 1–1 draw against France in the qualifying round first leg at Hillsborough. Ron Flowers of Wolverhampton Wanderers scores England's only goal.

25 October 1962: Alf Ramsey, the Ipswich Town manager, accepts The Football Association's offer to succeed Walter Winterbottom as England manager with effect from 1 May 1963, after agreeing taking charge of two earlier matches from 27 February 1963.

5 January 1963: The Big Freeze of 1963 impacts the third round of the FA Cup with only 3 of 32 fixtures played.

12 January 1963: Only eight League fixtures are played due to the bad weather.

23 January 1963: The Pools Panel is used to forecast the results of postponed matches for the first time.

26 January 1963: Only one fixture of the fourth round of the FA Cup is played as most of the third round ties have not been completed.

28 January 1963: FA Cup fifth round draw is postponed for a week.

2 February 1963: Only five League fixtures are played due to the bad weather.

4 February 1963: The FA postpone the fifth and sixth rounds of the FA Cup for a week.

9 February 1963: Only seven League fixtures are played due to the bad weather.

12 February 1963: The FA postpone the fifth and sixth rounds of the FA Cup further.

18 February 1963: The FA Cup semi-finals are postponed four weeks and the final three weeks.

27 February 1963: England are knocked out of the European Nations' Cup with a 5–2 defeat to France in Paris in the second leg of the qualifying round.

7 March 1963: Bradford City finally play their third round FA Cup tie against Newcastle United, losing 6–1.

11 March 1963: Middlesbrough beat Blackburn Rovers 3–1 to become the last team into the fourth round of the FA Cup.

16 March 1963: The fifth round of the FA Cup is finally played.

4 May 1963: English Double-chasing Leicester City are beaten by West Bromwich Albion in the top-flight, while Leyton Orient's defeat at Hillsborough Stadium leaves the East Londoners "practically doomed to relegation". In the Second Division, table-topping Stoke City were beaten by Scunthorpe United, and a hat-trick from Irishman Johnny Crossan features in Sunderland's 4–0 home victory over Southampton.  Leaders of the Fourth Division Brentford rack up their 26th league win of the season against Chesterfield, and move two points clear of Oldham Athletic, in second, with two games in hand. Outside of the League, Wimbledon win the FA Amateur Cup with victory over Sutton United in the Final.

11 May 1963: Everton seal the First Division title with a 4–1 home win over Fulham on the final day of the league season.

15 May 1963: Tottenham Hotspur become the first British club to win a European trophy, defeating Atlético Madrid 5–1 in the European Cup Winners' Cup Final in Rotterdam. Jimmy Greaves and Terry Dyson score twice each, with the other goal coming from John White.

18 May 1963: Stoke secure the Second Division Championship with a win over Luton Town, while Sunderland in second leave the door open for third-placed Chelsea by losing at home to the West Londoners. This result completes Sunderland's league programme, while Chelsea have one match remaining.

21 May 1963: Chelsea put seven past Portsmouth without reply and pip Sunderland to the remaining Second Division promotion place. The Third Division relegation decider between Walsall and Charlton Athletic is abandoned with the score 0–0 after the pitch was rendered unplayable by a thunderstorm.

23 May 1963: Birmingham City take a big step to winning the first major trophy of their history by defeating Aston Villa 3–1 at St Andrew's in the Football League Cup final first leg.

24 May 1963: England draw with the Football League XI at Arsenal Stadium. Jimmy Greaves, Alan Hinton and Johnny Byrne score for the Three Lions, while Roger Hunt, Geoff Hurst and Tony Kay score for the League. Elsewhere, Charlton preserve their Third Division status, relegating opponents Walsall in the process.

25 May 1963: Manchester United win their first major trophy for six years and their first FA Cup for 15 years with a 3–1 win over Leicester City in the final at Wembley Stadium. David Herd scores twice for United and Denis Law scores the other goal. Ken Keyworth scores the consolation goal for Leicester City, who have yet to win the final after three attempts.

27 May 1963: A goalless draw in the Football League Cup final second leg at Villa Park gives the trophy to Birmingham City.

31 May 1963: West Ham United, England's representative in the International Soccer League of 1963, begin their campaign by drawing 3–3 with Scottish club Kilmarnock in New York.

Awards
Football Writers' Association
 Footballer of the Year – Stanley Matthews (Stoke City)
Top goalscorer
 Jimmy Greaves, (Tottenham Hotspur), 37

Honours

Notes = Number in parentheses is the times that club has won that honour. * indicates new record for competition

Football League

First Division
In a First Division season with heavy fixture congestion brought about by a severe winter, Everton emerged as league champions – their first piece of postwar silverware. Tottenham Hotspur continued their brilliant start to the 1960s, finishing runners-up in the First Division and going on to lift the European Cup Winners' Cup to become English football's first winners of a European trophy. Burnley, the 1960 league champions, finished third. Leicester City, still yet to win a major trophy, emerge as surprise double challengers but eventually had to settle for a fourth-place finish in the league, and lost to Manchester United in the FA Cup final – with Matt Busby's rebuilding scheme paying off with the success being United's first trophy since the Munich air disaster five years earlier. 

Liverpool's return to the First Division saw them secure a decent eighth-place finish and their players adapt well to what for many of them was their first season playing in the First Division.

Birmingham City's consolation for narrowly avoiding relegation came in the shape of glory in the Football League Cup, the first major trophy of their 88-year history.

Leyton Orient's first season in the top flight was a dismal one, and they ended it with relegation and being 12 points adrift of safety. They were joined in relegation by Manchester City, who finally went down after several seasons of gradually falling out of contention for honours.

Second Division
Tony Waddington's impressive Stoke City side, which included 48-year-old FWA Footballer of the Year Stanley Matthews, former Manchester United forward Dennis Viollet and former Burnley star Jimmy McIlroy clinched the Second Division title and with it a place in the First Division. Chelsea were promoted as runners-up, while Sunderland missed out on goal average. 

Luton Town and Walsall went down to the Third Division.

Third Division
Northampton Town won the Third Division title and with it a place in the Second Division, while Swindon Town finally climbed out of the league's third tier, having been there since its creation 43 years previously. 

Halifax Town, Carlisle United, Brighton and Bradford Park Avenue went down to the Fourth Division.

Fourth Division
Brentford won the Fourth Division title, their first significant postwar success. Oldham Athletic, Crewe Alexandra and Mansfield Town also went up, while league newcomers Oxford United finished 18th. Bradford City, FA Cup winners in 1911 and First Division members for a number of seasons leading up to 1922, had to apply for re-election.

Top goalscorers

First Division
Jimmy Greaves (Tottenham Hotspur) – 37 goals

Second Division
Bobby Tambling (Chelsea) – 35 goals

Third Division
George Hudson (Coventry City) – 30 goals

Fourth Division
Ken Wagstaff (Mansfield Town) – 34 goals

References